Kristin Wells is a comic book character, the secret identity of one version of DC Comics Superwoman. Created by Superman comic writer Elliot S. Maggin, Wells first appeared in Maggin's novel Superman: Miracle Monday (1981); he later introduced her into comics continuity as Superwoman.

Fictional character biography
Wells is a descendant of Jimmy Olsen who lives in the 29th century (like Jimmy, Wells is a freckled redhead). She is a journalism student whose graduate thesis was the successful investigation of the origins of the holiday known as Miracle Monday, using a form of time travel technology that had just begun to be used by the public in her era. She then became a teacher, but became interested in finding out the identity of Superwoman, the last superhero from the 20th century whose secret identity had never been discovered. She managed to convince the authorities of her time to send her to the past, at the moment when Superwoman was supposed to debut, helping Superman fight a villain called King Kosmos. Wells soon deduced that she herself was supposed to become Superwoman, and, using some of the technology she had brought from the future which allowed her to have superpowers (including flight, teleportation, empathy, precognition, and telekinesis), she disguised herself and helped Superman defeat Kosmos. She revealed the truth to Superman, then returned to the future to make the information public. Wells realized she would have to periodically return to the 20th century to ensure that all the historical events Superwoman was part of were fulfilled.

However, during one of those trips, a malfunction of the time travel process—which was still imperfect—left Wells trapped in the past, suffering amnesia. This caused her boyfriend to lead a movement against time travel that eventually resulted in the firing of the director as well as stricter guidelines and more severe penalties for their violation. Years later, Wells returned home, apparently having recovered her memories, and was reunited with him. The details of her later activities in the present (and of her return to the future) remained unrevealed. The 29th-century Kristin's last appearances to date are in the non-canonical story Superman: Whatever Happened to the Man of Tomorrow? in 1986, and a brief cameo as a one panel ghost in The Kingdom: Planet Krypton in 1999.

Third Kryptonian 

In Superman: The Third Kryptonian, it is revealed that a third Kryptonian (that is, after Clark and Kara) is on Earth. It is explained that the third Kryptonian does not refer to Chris Kent (Superman's foster son, General Zod's biological child), Power Girl (an Earth-Two Kryptonian) or Krypto (a canine Kryptonian). The storyline introduces a new Kristin Wells, an older woman and Kryptonian survivor named Karsta Wor-Ul who had left the planet many years before its destruction.

Powers and abilities 
In Pre-Crisis, Wells has no inherent superpowers. For the most part Superwoman's powers were based on 29th century technology. Using a gravity redistribution flightbelt she was able to fly and an opal beam amulet gave her the power of decorporealization, which among other things enabled her to pass through solid objects. The opal amulet also gave her the power of teleportation. Amulet mass reduction gave her superhuman strength. Combined with a time-warp belt the amulet could create a five-dimensional "hole poker" that could create time/space warps. Space-pocket retention gave her invulnerability and time-field projection gave her limited intuition abilities.

Following the Third Kryptonian storyline, Wells has powers closely associated with Kryptonians.

See also
Superwoman

References

External links
Kristin Wells at the Unofficial Who's Who in the DC Universe
Kristin Wells at Superman Through the Ages website

Comics characters introduced in 1981
DC Comics metahumans
DC Comics characters who can move at superhuman speeds
DC Comics characters who can teleport
DC Comics characters with superhuman senses
DC Comics characters with superhuman strength
DC Comics female characters 
DC Comics characters who have mental powers
DC Comics telekinetics 
DC Comics telepaths
Fictional characters with precognition
Fictional empaths
Fictional characters with nuclear or radiation abilities
Fictional characters with energy-manipulation abilities
Fictional characters with fire or heat abilities
Kryptonians
Superman characters